Tricolia capensis, common name the pheasant shell, is a species of sea snail, a marine gastropod mollusk in the family Phasianellidae.

Description

The size of the shell varies between 5 mm and 15 mm.

Distribution
This marine species occurs off Namibia, South Africa and Mozambique.

References

 Robertson, R. 1985. Archaeogastropod biology and the systematics of the genus Tricolia (Trochacea: Tricoliidae) in the Indo-West Pacific. Monographs of Marine Mollusca 3: 1–103. page(s): 21
 Gofas, S.; Afonso, J.P.; Brandào, M. (Ed.). (S.a.). Conchas e Moluscos de Angola = Coquillages et Mollusques d'Angola. [Shells and molluscs of Angola]. Universidade Agostinho / Elf Aquitaine Angola: Angola. 140 pp.
 Steyn, D.G. & Lussi, M. (1998) Marine Shells of South Africa. An Illustrated Collector’s Guide to Beached Shells. Ekogilde Publishers, Hartebeespoort, South Africa, ii + 264 pp. page(s): 28

External links
 ranch, G.M. et al. (2002). Two Oceans. 5th impression. David Philip, Cate Town & Johannesburg
 

Phasianellidae
Gastropods described in 1846